Roberto Manini (born 11 January 1942) is an Italian former professional footballer who played as a defender. He appeared once in Serie A for Inter, played in Serie B for Potenza, and made nearly 450 appearances in Serie C.

References

1942 births
Living people
Footballers from Milan
Italian footballers
Association football defenders
Inter Milan players
Carrarese Calcio players
S.E.F. Torres 1903 players
Potenza S.C. players
Novara F.C. players
S.S.D. Acireale Calcio 1946 players
U.S. Massese 1919 players
Serie A players
Serie C players
Serie B players